General Maharaja Sir Ganga Singh,  (13 October 1880 – 2 February 1943), was the ruling Maharaja of the princely state of Bikaner (in present-day Rajasthan, India) from 1888 to 1943. As a member of the Imperial War Cabinet, he was present in the Palace of Versailles during The Signing of Peace in the Hall of Mirrors.

Biography 
Ganga Singh was born on the auspicious day of Vijay Dashmi on 13 October 1880 to Maharaj Shri Lal Singh Sahib and his wife Maji Shri Chandravatiji Sahiba. He hailed from Royal Rajput family of Bikaner State. He was brother to Dungar Singh, whom he succeeded on 16 December 1888.

He received his early education from Pandit Ram Chandra Dube. He was educated privately at Mayo College, Ajmer, where he studied for 5 years. Later on, he was tutored by Sir Brian Egerton, who also provided him administrative training. 

For military training, he was sent to Deoli in 1898 and attached to the 42nd Deoli Regiment, which had the reputation of being one of the finest regiments in India under the command of Lt. Col. Bell. He served in China during the Boxer Rebellion (1900). During the First World War, he commanded the Bikaner Camel Corps which served in France, Egypt and Palestine.

As a ruler, he established a Chief Court in Bikaner, presided over by a Chief Judge who was assisted by two judges. Bikaner was the first State in Rajasthan to take such a step. He announced the establishment of a Representative Assembly in 1913. He later established a High Court with a Chief Justice and two sub-judges by an edict in 1922. Maharaja Ganga Singhji was the first prince in Rajputana to grant full charter of powers to a high court.

A life insurance and Endowment Assurance Scheme was introduced for the benefit of the employees. Also, facilities of a saving bank were made available to the people. He was one of the first rulers to introduce through legislation a Sharda Act by which child marriages were stopped.

He had a personal gun salute of 17-guns granted in 1918 and a permanent local gun salute of 19-guns granted in 1921. He was an Honorary ADC to the Prince of Wales when he visited the United Kingdom for the Coronation in 1902, later serving him when he became His Majesty King George V, the King-Emperor, in 1910. A Member of the Central Recruiting Board-India 1917, he represented India at the Imperial War Conference 1917, the Imperial War Cabinet and the Paris Peace Conference 1919 and was Chancellor of the Indian Chamber of Princes from 1920–26. He also represented India as a delegate at the fifth session of the League of Nations in 1924.
As well, the Maharaja served as Patron of Benares Hindu University and Sri Bharat Dharam Mahamandal, as Vice-President of East India Association and the Royal Colonial Institute, a Member of the Indian Gymkhana Club and of the Indian Army Temperance Association, the General Council of Mayo and Daly Colleges, the Indian Society of Oriental Art, the Indian Society-London, the Bombay Natural History Society, and was the first Member of the Indian Red Cross Society. Singh was a famous Indian freemason in his time.

He was also the third Chairman of the Indian Public Schools Society (The Doon School) from 1929 to 1930.

Family

Marriages 
Maharaja Ganga Singh married three times. In July 1897, he married Maharani Vallabh Kanwar (known in Bikaner as "Maharani Ranawatiji" in honour of her native clan), daughter of Maharawat Raghunath Singh Bahadur, ruler of Pratapgarh State; she bore three children and died in August 1906. In May 1899, Ganga Singh married the daughter of Thakur Sultan Singh of Sanwatsar (a feudal chief under Bikaner state itself). The lady, known in court as "Maharani Tanwarji" in honour of her native clan, died without progeny in 1922. In May 1908, Ganga Singh married Maharani Ajab Kanwar, daughter of Thakur Bahadur Singh of Bhikamkore under Jodhpur state. Known as "Maharani Sri Bhatianiji" in honour of her native clan, she bore three children and died in November 1945, surviving Ganga Singh by more than two years.

Children

Death 
He died on 2 February 1943 in Bombay after a reign of 56 years, aged 62, and was succeeded by his son Sadul Singh as His Highness the Maharaja Sahib of Bikaner.

Achievements 

 Singh constructed the Ganga Canal. He inspired people to come and settle in this new Command area. A large population settled there from the surrounding areas of Punjab. Among them the Sikh families mostly land owners, migrated to this region in the 1920s, when the canal was built by Maharaja Ganga Singh of the former Bikaner state bringing waters of the Satluj river from the adjoining Ferozepur District in Punjab. There were no permanent settlements in this area (except for a few towns under the old Bikaner state
 He successfully dealt with the worst famine of the year 1899–1900 AD in the region. This famine inspired the young Maharaja to establish an irrigation system to get rid of the problem permanently.
 He developed the city of Sri Ganganagar and its surrounding area as the most fertile grain bowl of Rajasthan
 He also constructed the Lalgarh Palace at Bikaner (named in memory of his father Lall Singh) between 1902 and 1926.
 He brought railways and an electricity network to the state.
 He introduced prison reforms. Bikaner prisoners wove and crafted carpets of India that were sold in the international markets.
 He established partial internal democracy such as election to the municipalities and appointed a council of ministers to aid and advice.
 Some land reforms were also introduced.
 He induced enterprising Industrialist and agriculturists from neighbouring state for starting new ventures in his state.
 He built the existing temple above the Samadhi of Ramdev Pir at Ramdevra in year 1931.
Founder several schools and colleges, especially of women
He donated two ornately designed silver gates to be used as main doors of Karni Mata temple at Deshnok.

Memorials 
The University of Bikaner was renamed after him as Maharaja Ganga Singh University, Bikaner by an act passed in 2003.

See also 
 List of Rajputs
 List of famous big game hunters

References

External links

 Ganga Singh at realbikaner.com
 Ganga Singh at the British National Portrait Gallery

Rajput rulers
1880 births
1943 deaths
Bailiffs Grand Cross of the Order of St John
Founders of Indian schools and colleges
Indian Army personnel
Indian Army personnel of World War I
Knights Commander of the Order of the Bath
Knights Grand Commander of the Order of the Indian Empire
Knights Grand Commander of the Order of the Star of India
Indian Knights Grand Cross of the Order of the British Empire
Indian Knights Grand Cross of the Royal Victorian Order
Maharajas of Bikaner
Recipients of the Kaisar-i-Hind Medal